Burmah may refer to:
Burma (Myanmar), a Southeast Asian country
Burmah Oil Company
Burmah, a ship which disappeared en route from London to New Zealand in 1859/60.